Laplace is a hydrographic survey ship of the French Navy, third of the s.

Career 
In 1999, Laplace surveyed the Persian Gulf, retrieving samples from the sea floor under 3000 metres of water.

In 2004, she took part in an anti-drug operation leading to the capture of 2 tonnes of cocaine.

In 2016, after the crash of EgyptAir Flight 804, Laplace was dispatched to search for the black boxes of the aircraft. She departed her base of Porto-Vecchio, in Corsica, on 27 May and arrived at the search area by 31 May. On 1 June Laplace detected a signal from one of the black box recorders.

References
Citations

References
  (1870-2006)

See also
List of active French Navy ships

Ships built in France
1988 ships
Survey ships of the French Navy